is a trans-Neptunian object located in the scattered disc. It was discovered on 30 July 2008 through the Palomar Observatory. It displays a large light curve amplitude of  magnitudes, implying that it is highly elongated in shape, similar to 20000 Varuna.

References

External links 
 

Scattered disc and detached objects
Discoveries by the Palomar Observatory
Possible dwarf planets
20080730